Foxwarren is a community in the Prairie View Municipality in the Canadian province of Manitoba. It is located along the concurrence of Provincial Trunk Highways 16 and 83.

The community was first noted on a map in 1888 as Fox Warren. The Post Office opened in 1889. The Canadian Pacific Railway established a railpoint and a school district were formed with the same name.

An Environment Canada Radar station is located in Foxwarren. It serves the Westman Region of the province.

Famous residents
The community of Foxwarren has contributed a few players to the NHL over the years.
 Ron Low
 Pat Falloon
 Mark Wotton

Bibliography
 Geographical Names of Manitoba - Foxwarren (page 86) - the Millennium Bureau of Canada

References

External links 

 Weather Radar - Foxwarren, Manitoba

Unincorporated communities in Westman Region